Peter Walter (born December 5, 1954) is a German-American molecular biologist and biochemist and is Director of the Bay Area Institute of Science at Altos Labs, Professor at the University of California, San Francisco (UCSF). He was a Howard Hughes Medical Institute (HHMI) Investigator until 2022.

Education
Peter attended the Freie Universität Berlin, received his MS in Organic Chemistry from Vanderbilt University in 1977 and his PhD in Cell Biology at The Rockefeller University in 1981.

Career
During his thesis work in Dr. Günter Blobel's laboratory, Walter purified the proteinaceous members of a macromolecular complex essential for protein translocation into the endoplasmic reticulum (ER)  and showed that it selectively recognizes nascent secretory proteins in the cytoplasm of eukaryotic cells and targets them to the ER. He subsequently identified a 7S RNA component of the complex which is essential for its function and named the holocomplex the signal recognition particle (SRP).

Walter moved from Rockefeller to start his own laboratory at the University of California, San Francisco. He and his group identified an ER resident transmembrane kinase/endoribonuclease, Ire1, which is one of three known sensors of the folding capacity within the endoplasmic reticulum lumen responsible for initiating a signaling pathway known as the unfolded protein response.

Walter's laboratory at UCSF continues to focus on gaining a mechanistic understanding of protein sorting/targeting to the ER as well as a better understanding the interplay between ER homeostasis and disease.

Walter describes his career as "Walking Along the Serendipitous Path of Discovery" and goes on to say "Personally, I would consider it a crowning highlight of my career if some aspects of the basic knowledge that we have accumulated over the years are translated into a tangible benefit for mankind. Yet importantly, none of these tremendous opportunities were obvious when we started on our journey; they only emerged gradually as we playfully and fervently followed the turns of our meandering and serendipitous path."

Awards and honors
Walter is an elected member of the National Academy of Sciences, American Academy of Arts and Sciences, the National Academy of Medicine, and the National Academy of Inventors. His recent awards include the 2014 Shaw Prize in Life Science and Medicine, the 2014 Lasker Award for Basic Medical Research, the 2015 Vilcek Prize in Biomedical Science, the 2018 Breakthrough Prize in Life Sciences, and 2020 UCSF Lifetime Achievement in Mentoring Award.

Walter is a coauthor of the textbook Molecular Biology of the Cell.

References

External links

 

1954 births
Living people
American molecular biologists
21st-century American biologists
German molecular biologists
Howard Hughes Medical Investigators
Members of the United States National Academy of Sciences
University of California, San Francisco faculty
Rockefeller University alumni
Free University of Berlin alumni
Recipients of the Albert Lasker Award for Basic Medical Research
Members of the National Academy of Medicine